Suspect Device may refer to

 "Suspect Device", a single by Stiff Little Fingers from the 1979 album Inflammable Material
 Suspect Device, an Ohio-based punk rock band of the early 1980s that included Doug Gillard
 Suspect Device (film), a 1995 science fiction television movie starring C. Thomas Howell